3-Iodophenol (m-iodophenol) is an aromatic organic compound. 3-Iodophenol participates in a variety of coupling reactions in which the iodide substituent is displaced.  Well cited examples include thiolate and amine nucleophiles.

3-Iodophenol can be prepared by oxidative decarboxylation of 3-iodobenzoic acid:

References 

Iodoarenes
Phenols